Where's My Bytches is the second studio album by Arabian Prince.

Track listing
 "Where's My Bytches" – 1:24
 "Ho's 2 Bozak" – 5:52
 "Where Ya Been Bytch" – 5:18
 "Gotta Get Some Pussy Quick" – 5:00
 "Shoulda Stayed in My Bed" – 3:50
 "2 Ply"  – 4:25
 "Up 2 No Good" – 4:10
 "Tha Underworld" – 3:28
 "Treat Ya Like a Ho" – 3:39
 "Hoochie Momma" – 3:37
 "Give It up Tonight"  – 4:04
 "A Poem From a Pimp" – 6:01
 "Sex" – 5:09
 "A Little Jazz 4 Yo Azz" – 5:43
 "Outro" – 1:14

Personnel
 Nanci Fletcher – Backing Vocals
 Paula Brown – Backing Vocals
 Side Show – Co-Producer/Performer
 Arabian Prince – Performer/Co-Producer
 Mike "Crazy Neck" Simms – Guitar

References

Arabian Prince albums
1990 albums